Let's Have a Party is a studio album by American recording artist Wanda Jackson. It was released in 1995 via Elap Music and Success Records. Released exclusively for the European market, the album project included Danish rock band The Alligators and contained 12 tracks. While some songs were new recordings for Jackson, most of the album was re-recordings of Jackson's rockabilly and country hits from decades prior.

Background, content and release
Wanda Jackson was among the first female artists to have success in both country and Rockabilly music. During the 1950s and 1960s, she had hits in both genres with songs like "Let's Have a Party" and "Tears Will Be the Chaser for Your Wine". In the 1980s, Rockabilly revived in Europe and Jackson was rediscovered by fans overseas. From this exposure, she  started touring in Europe and recorded a series of albums for the market overseas. In 1994, she met Danish rock group The Alligators. Impressed by their music, she decided to record an album with the band in 1994. Let's Have a Party would be recorded that year at the Country Sound Studio, located in Borup, Denmark. The record was produced by Morten Kjeldsen of The Alligators.

While Jackson performed lead vocals, The Alligators served as her backing band on the album. A total of 12 tracks comprised the disc, only four of which were new recordings. The new recordings included "From Alaska to L.A." and Jackson's version of "Whiskey, If You Were a Woman". The remaining eight tracks were re-recordings of Jackson's most popular country and rockabilly singles. Songs re-recorded for the project included the title track, "Right or Wrong", "In the Middle of a Heartache" and "Honey Pop". The disc was released in compact disc form on the Elap and Success labels, exclusively for European markets. On the album, The Alligators are not given dual credit with Jackson. Instead, they are included as her backing band.

Track listing

Personnel
All credits are adapted from the liner notes of Let's Have a Party.

Musical and technical personnelThe Alligators (see below)
 Olle Ballund – Background vocals, drums
 Jess Dan – Background vocals, bass
 Morten Kjeldsen – Background vocals, guitar, producer
 Wanda Jackson – Lead vocals
 Stan Urban – Piano

Release history

References

1995 albums
Wanda Jackson albums